Del City High School is the only public high school located in Del City, Oklahoma, U.S., and one of three high schools in the Mid-Del School District. The school opened in 1953. According to GreatSchools.org, the high school is rated above Midwest City High School and below Carl Albert High School, the other two high schools in the district. The school serves approximately 1,254 students. About a third of graduating students attend a four-year college.

History
Del City High School opened in 1953 and graduated its first class soon after.

Curriculum
The curriculum taught at Del City High is governed by state-mandated requirements for graduation. Subjects taught are physical education, Spanish, French, biology, chemistry, physics, business, general education, social studies, English, mathematics, career and technology, and the fine arts.

To graduate, students must take a total of 27 classes. Students take four classes each of language arts, mathematics, and social studies. They are required to take three science classes, two fine arts classes, two foreign language or computer technology classes and a physical education class.

Sports
Del City High School students participate in baseball, cross country, softball, track, basketball, American football, swimming, volleyball, golf, soccer, tennis, marching band, colorguard and wrestling.

Basketball
The boys' team won the 1980 5A State Championship 49–34 against Lawton Eisenhower.

In 2009, the girls' basketball team made its fourth appearance in the 6A State Tournament going on to win the 6A State Championship for their first ever State Championship.

In 2021 boys basketball won the 6A state championship

American football
The Del City Eagles have won one championship beating Putman City West 27–13 in 1976. On September 4, 2009, Del City Eagles beat their Sooner Road rivals, The Midwest City Bombers, for the first time since 2002 with a final score of 27–15. Del City, then coached by former Washington Redskin Leo Presley, defeated Midwest City in the first-ever rivalry match-up between the two teams.

Extra-curricular activities

Student Council
Del City Student Council is responsible for a number of activities with the school and community. It is an active member of the Oklahoma Association of Student Councils and National Association of Student Councils and attends the former's state convention and two District 9 workshops yearly and the annual Trey Leadership Conference. The council hosts WILD Week (Willing Individuals Leading with Determination) It was named the Oklahoma Association of Student Council State Secretary for 2014 and hosted the Oklahoma Association of Student Councils 74th State Conference on November 8–10, 2014.

National Honor Society
The National Honor Society honors those students who have demonstrated excellence in the areas of scholarship, leadership, service and character.

Band
The Del City High School Band program consists of the Pride of Del City marching band, concert band, two jazz bands, drumline, winterguard and an athletic pep band. The band is active in the community and the state, doing over 50 performances throughout the school year. There are two full jazz bands. The Advanced Jazz Band was 2013 and 2016, 2017, 2018, 2019 OSSAA state champions.

Naval Junior Reserve Officer Training Corps
The Naval Junior Reserve Officer Training Corps teaches cadets basic military skills, military history, leadership skills and techniques, and discipline.

Del City High School's unit, called Eagle Company, was created in fall 1994. It is a multi-disciplinary curriculum encompassing leadership, citizenship, health, study skills, history, meteorology, astronomy, oceanography, navigation, current events, military drill, physical fitness and fun. In addition to the academics, students are given opportunities to assume various responsibilities within the unit as squad or platoon leaders. The unit hosts four drill teams, a color (honor) guard, marksmanship, athletic and academic teams. The academic teams have consistently been ranked in the top fifty of the US, competing against over 3,000 NJROTC teams nationwide. The color guards have appeared around the state at numerous civic and military functions. The cadets perform at community service functions and fund raisers, and were awarded the Volunteer Organization of the Year award by the American Red Cross, the Distinguished Unit award, and Unit Achievement awards by the Navy. The cadets have raised thousands of dollars for the Special Olympics, provided holiday meals to the less fortunate, and provided monetary and physical assistance to disaster (tornado/flooding) victims.

Notable alumni
Nick Blackburn, pitcher for the Minnesota Twins.
Clark Jolley (1988) Oklahoma State Senator.
Scott Inman (1997) Oklahoma House of Representatives, leader designate of the minority party of the Oklahoma House of Representatives effective 2010.
Bob Kalsu (1963), All-American tackle at the University of Oklahoma, drafted by the Buffalo Bills; Robert Kalsu Stadium  is named in his honor.
Steve Russell (1981), retired army lieutenant colonel and author of the book We Got Him! A Memoir of the Hunt and Capture of Saddam Hussein. A former Oklahoma State Senator and US House of Representatives for Oklahoma's 5th congressional district.
Josh Scobey (1997) NFL player, is currently playing for Las Vegas Locomotives football team.
John Smith (1983), Olympic freestyle wrestler, 2-time NCAA champion, 4-time World champion, 2-time Olympic champion, current head wrestling coach at Oklahoma State University.
Pat Smith (1989), first four-time NCAA Division I wrestling champion.

References

External links
 Official website
 Official Del City High Sports network

Public high schools in Oklahoma
Schools in Oklahoma County, Oklahoma
Del City, Oklahoma
Education in Oklahoma County, Oklahoma